Giovanni Bella, best known as Gianni Bella (born 14 March 1946), is an Italian composer and singer-songwriter.

Background 
Born in Catania, Bella started his career as composer for his sister, singer Marcella Bella authoring several hits with lyricist Giancarlo Bigazzi.  In the seventies he debuted as a singer himself, scoring his first major success in 1974 with the song "Più ci penso", which ranked second in the Italian hit parade. In 1976 he topped the hit parade and won the Festivalbar contest with the song "Non si può morire dentro", originally planned to be sung by her sister. In 1981 he entered the competition at the Sanremo Music Festival with the song "Questo amore non si tocca"; he returned in Sanremo five more times between 1986 and 2007, three times in couple with her sister Marcella. In 1983 Bella stopped the collaboration with Bigazzi and started a new phase alongside Mogol; between late 1990s and 2000s the couple signed some extraordinary sales successes for Adriano Celentano. In January 2010 he suffered a stroke and subsequently he lost his speech and the use of a leg.

Discography

Selected singles

Studio albums
 1974 - Guarda che ti amo (Derby)
 1976 - Sogni di un robot (Derby)
 1977 - Io canto e tu (Derby)
 1978 - Toc toc (CGD)
 1980 - Dolce uragano (CGD)
 1981 - Questo amore... (CGD)
 1983 - G.b.1 - Nuova gente (Avventura)
 1984 - G.b.2 (Avventura)
 1986 - Una luce (RCA Italiana)
 1988 - Due cuori rossi di vergogna (Polydor)
 1991 - La fila degli oleandri (Fonit Cetra)
 1994 - Vocalist (Fonit Cetra) 
 1998 - Finalmente insieme (with Marcella Bella) (Pull/Fuego)
 2001 - Il profumo del mare (SDC/Sony Music)
 2007 - Forever per sempre (with Marcella Bella) (Nuova Gente/Universal Music)

Live albums
 1992 - Gianni Bella live (Fonit Cetra)
 1996 - Grandi successi - live (Duck Record)

Notes

References

External links

 

 

1946 births
Musicians from Catania
Italian singer-songwriters
Italian pop singers
Living people
Composers from Sicily
Italian male composers
Spanish-language singers of Italy
20th-century Italian composers
20th-century Italian male musicians